Sir Herbert Butterfield  (7 October 1900 – 20 July 1979) was an English historian and philosopher of history, who was Regius Professor of Modern History and Vice-Chancellor of the University of Cambridge. He is remembered chiefly for a short volume early in his career entitled The Whig Interpretation of History (1931) and for his Origins of Modern Science (1949). Butterfield turned increasingly to historiography and man's developing view of the past. Butterfield was a devout Christian and reflected at length on Christian influences in historical perspectives.

Butterfield thought that individual personalities were more important than great systems of government or economics in historical study. His Christian beliefs in personal sin, salvation and providence were a great influence in his writings, a fact he freely admitted. At the same time, Butterfield's early works emphasised the limits of a historian's moral conclusions, "If history can do anything it is to remind us that all our judgments are merely relative to time and circumstance".

Biography 

Butterfield was born on 7 October 1900 in Oxenhope, West Yorkshire, and was raised a devout Methodist, which he remained for life.  Despite his humble origins, receiving his education at the Trade and Grammar School in Keighley, in 1919 he won a scholarship to study at Peterhouse, Cambridge, graduating with a BA in 1922, followed by an MA four years later. Butterfield was a fellow at Cambridge from 1928 to 1979 and in the 1950s, he was a fellow of the Institute for Advanced Study in Princeton, New Jersey. He was Master of Peterhouse (1955–1968), Vice-Chancellor of the University (1959–1961) and Regius Professor of Modern History (1963–1968). Butterfield served as editor of the Cambridge Historical Journal from 1938 to 1955 and was knighted in 1968. 

He married Edith Joyce Crawshaw in 1929 and had three children. He died on 20 July 1979.

Work
Butterfield's main interests were historiography, the history of science, 18th-century constitutional history, Christianity and history as well as the theory of international politics. He delivered the Gifford Lectures at the University of Glasgow in 1965.  As a deeply religious Protestant, Butterfield was highly concerned with religious issues, but he did not believe that historians could uncover the hand of God in history. At the height of the Cold War, he warned that conflicts between self-righteous value systems could be catastrophic:

The Whig Interpretation of History 

Butterfield's book, The Whig Interpretation of History (1931), became a classic for history students and is still widely read. Butterfield had in mind especially the historians of his own country but his criticism of the retrospective creation of a line of progress toward the glorious present can be and has subsequently been applied generally. The "Whig interpretation of history" is now a general label applied to various historical interpretations.

Butterfield found the Whig interpretation of history objectionable because it warps the past to see it in terms of the issues of the present and attempts to squeeze the contending forces of the past into a form that reminds us of ourselves. Butterfield argued that the historian must seek the ability to see events as they were perceived by those who lived through them. Butterfield wrote that "Whiggishness" is too handy a "rule of thumb... by which the historian can select and reject, and can make his points of emphasis".

He also wrote about how simple pick-and-choose history misses the point, "Very strange bridges are used to make the passage from one state of things to another; we may lose sight of them in our surveys of general history, but their discovery is the glory of historical research.  History is not the study of origins; rather it is the analysis of all the mediations by which the past was turned into our present". In 1944, Butterfield wrote in The Englishman and His History that,

We are all of us exultant and unrepentant whigs. Those who, perhaps in the misguided austerity of youth, wish to drive out that whig interpretation, (that particular thesis which controls our abridgment of English history,) are sweeping a room which humanly speaking cannot long remain empty. They are opening the door for seven devils which, precisely because they are newcomers, are bound to be worse than the first. We, on the other hand, will not dream of wishing it away, but will rejoice in an interpretation of the past which has grown up with us, has grown up with the history itself, and has helped to make the history... we must congratulate ourselves that our 17th-century forefathers... did not resurrect and fasten upon us the authentic middle ages... in England we made peace with our middle ages by misconstruing them; and, therefore, we may say that "wrong" history was one of our assets. The whig interpretation came at exactly the crucial moment and, whatever it may have done to our history, it had a wonderful effect on English politics... in every Englishman there is hidden something of a whig that seems to tug at the heart-strings.

Christianity and History 
Butterfield's 1949 book Christianity and History, asks if history provides answers to the meaning of life, answering in the negative:

 "So the purpose of life is not in the far future, nor, as we so often imagine, around the next corner, but the whole of it is here and now, as fully as ever it will be on this planet."
 "If there is a meaning in history, therefore, it lies not in the systems and organizations that are built over long periods, but in something more essentially human, something in each personality considered for mundane purposes as an end in himself."
 "I have nothing to say at the finish except that if one wants a permanent rock in life and goes deep enough for it, it is difficult for historical events to shake it. There are times when we can never meet the future with sufficient elasticity of mind, especially if we are locked in the contemporary systems of thought. We can do worse than remember a principle which both gives us a firm Rock and leaves us the maximum elasticity for our minds: the principle: Hold to Christ, and for the rest be totally uncommitted."

Butterfield and his Anglo-Catholic contemporary, Christopher Dawson, have been referred to as prominent "providential" historians.

The Origins of Modern Science
According to Brian Vickers, in the 1949 book The Origins of Modern Science Butterfield makes simplistic generalisations which "seem unworthy of a serious historian". Vickers considers the book a late example of the earliest stage of modern analysis of the history of Renaissance magic in relation to the development of science, when magic was largely dismissed as being "entertaining but irrelevant".

Prizes and accolades

In 1922, Butterfield was awarded the University Member's Prize for English Essay, writing on the subject of English novelist Charles Dickens and the way in which the author straddled the fields of history and literature.

In 1923, Butterfield won the Le Bas Prize for his first publication, The Historical Novel; the work was published in 1924.

Also in 1924, Butterfield won the Prince Consort Prize for a work on the problem of peace in Europe between 1806 and 1808. At the same time, he was given the Seeley Medal.

Bibliography
The Historical Novel, 1924.
The Peace Tactics of Napoleon, 1806-1808, 1929.
 The Whig Interpretation of History, London: G. Bell, 1931.
Napoleon, Duckworth, Great Lives series, 1939.
The Statecraft of Machiavelli, 1940.
The Englishman and His History, 1944.
Lord Acton, 1948.
Christianity and History, 1949.
George III, Lord North and the People, 1779-80, 1949.
The Origins of Modern Science, 1300-1800, 1949.
History and Human Relations, 1951. Contains the essay "Moral Judgments in History".
The Reconstruction of an Historical Episode: The History of the Enquiry into the Origins of the Seven Years' War, 1951.
Liberty in the Modern World, 1951.
Christianity in European History, 1952.
Christianity, Diplomacy and War, 1953.
Man on His Past: The Study of the History of Historical Scholarship, 1955.
George III and the Historians, 1957, revised edition, 1959.
International Conflict in the Twentieth Century, 1960.
History and Man's Attitude to the Past, 1961.
The Universities and Education Today, 1962.
The present state of historical scholarship, 1965.
Diplomatic Investigations: Essays in the Theory of International Politics (co-edited with Martin Wight), 1966.
Magna Carta in the Historiography of the Sixteenth and Seventeenth Centuries, 1969.
The Discontinuities between the Generations in History, 1971.
The Politicization of Society: Essays, 1979.
The Origins of History (edited by A. Watson) (1981). His final thoughts on history, emphasizing the role of religion.
Essays on the History of Science (edited by Karl W. Schweizer, 2005)
The International Thought of Herbert Butterfield (edited by Karl W. Schweizer and Paul Sharp, 2006)

See also
Diversity of History: Essays in Honour of Sir Herbert Butterfield, Routledge and K. Paul, London, 1970.
 British committee on the theory of international politics

Notes

References
Bentley, Michael The Life and Thought of Herbert Butterfield: History, Science and God, Cambridge University Press, 2012.
Chadwick, Owen "Acton and Butterfield" pages 386-405 from Journal of Ecclesiastical History, volume 38, 1987.
Coll, Alberto R. The Wisdom of Statecraft: Sir Herbert Butterfield and the Philosophy of International Politics, Durham, NC: Duke University Press, 1985.
Elliott, J.H. & H.G. Koenigsberger (editors) The Diversity of History: Essays in Honour of Sir Herbert Butterfield, Ithaca, NY: Cornell University Press, 1970.
Elton, G.R. "Herbert Butterfield and the Study of History" pages 729-743 from Historical Journal, Volume 27, 1984.
 Reba N. Soffer. History, Historians, and Conservatism in Britain and America: From the Great War to Thatcher and Reagan (2009), chapter on Butterfield
Thompson, Kenneth W. (editor) Herbert Butterfield: The Ethics of History and Politics, Washington: University Press of America, 1980.
 Schweizer, Karl, The International Thought of Herbert Butterfield, Basingstoke, Palgrave Macmillan, 2007
 Schweizer, Karl, ed. Herbert Butterfield: Essays on the History of Science, New York: Edwin Mellen Press, 2005

Further reading
Bentley, Michael, The Life and Thought of Herbert Butterfield, History, Science and God, Cambridge University Press, 2011. .
 Coll, Alberto R., The Wisdom of Statecraft: Sir Herbert Butterfield and the Philosophy of International Politics, Duke University Press, 1985.
 McClay, Wilfred M., Whig History at Eighty: The Enduring Relevance of Herbert Butterfield and His Most Famous Book, 2011.
 McIntire, C. T., Herbert Butterfield: Historian as Dissenter, Yale University Press, 2004
 McIntyre, Kenneth B., Herbert Butterfield:  History, Providence, and Skeptical Politics, ISI Books, 2011
 Sewell, Keith C., Herbert Butterfield and the Interpretation of History, Palgrave Macmillan, 2005

External links 

 Herbert Butterfield at Yale University Press
 Modern Pioneers: Herbert Butterfield 
 
 

1900 births
1979 deaths
20th-century English historians
20th-century Methodists
Alumni of Peterhouse, Cambridge
English Methodists
Fellows of the British Academy
Historians of Christianity
Historians of Europe
Historians of science
Historiographers
Intellectual historians
International relations historians
Knights Bachelor
Masters of Peterhouse, Cambridge
Members of the University of Cambridge faculty of history
Methodist philosophers
People from Sawston
People from West Yorkshire
Philosophers of history
Vice-Chancellors of the University of Cambridge
Regius Professors of History (Cambridge)
Whig history